In 1064, a large Seljuk army under Alp Arslan attacked Ani; After a 25-day siege, they captured the city.
Ani was a solid and very crowded city. It was a stronghold of the Christians of the time. It was very difficult to conquer Ani, which was surrounded by very formidable walls The castles were beaten with catapults and the Seljuk soldiers entered and put the entire Byzantine army to the sword. So much so that some of the soldiers could not enter the city due to the abundance of corpses. The Seljuk soldiers captured many times more than the ones they killed.

References

Battles involving the Seljuk Empire
Sieges involving the Byzantine Empire
Sieges of the Byzantine–Seljuk wars